The fifth and final season of The Real Housewives of Melbourne, an Australian reality television series, was broadcast on FOX Arena. It aired from 10 October 2021, until 12 December 2021 and was primarily filmed in Melbourne, Victoria. Executive Producers are Pip Rubira and Dan Munday, along with consulting Executive Producer Lisa Potasz for Matchbox Pictures, part of NBCUniversal International Studios, in conjunction with Foxtel.

The Real Housewives of Melbourne focuses on the lives of Jackie Gillies, Janet Roach, Gamble Breaux, Anjali Rao, Cherry Dipietrantonio, Kyla Kirkpatrick, and Simone Elliott; it consisted of ten episodes.

Production and crew
Foxtel renewed The Real Housewives of Melbourne for a fifth season in September 2019, with the season set to premiere in 2020. Foxtel Executive Director of Television Brian Walsh confirmed casting discussions had commenced for the upcoming fifth season and would include "a big cast shake up."

Production on the fifth season was confirmed for July 2020, but was later pushed to January 2021, due to delays caused by the COVID-19 pandemic. In a statement released by Foxtel and Matchbox Pictures, “The Health and Safety of our cast and crew is our top priority.” Filming for the season concluded in July 2021.

An all cast reunion was not filmed for the fifth season, marking the first time in the series history to not feature a reunion.

Cast and synopsis
On 19 February 2020, Foxtel announced the cast for the fifth season, confirming the return of Gamble Breaux, Gina Liano, Janet Roach and Lydia Schiavello, as well as the addition of newcomers Anjali Rao, Kyla Kirkpatrick and Cherry Dipietrantonio. Sally Bloomfield, Jackie Gillies and Venus Behbahani-Clark departed the cast.

The following year, Foxtel confirmed the cast for a second time in April 2021, with Roach and Breaux returning, as well as the previously announced additions of Rao, Kirkpatrick, and Dipietrantonio. Gillies, who had previously departed, was announced as returning to the series, along with new addition Simone Elliott. Liano and Schiavello, who were previously set to return, confirmed their departures from the series.

Liano confirmed in September 2021, she left the series to focus on her career as a barrister, stating "When season five got cancelled last year I threw myself into my career and when they spoke to me about the new series I thought, I can't take six months off my practice, it's just too destructive". In the same interview, Liano revealed she almost departed the series after the first season, however Real Housewives of Beverly Hills cast member Lisa Vanderpump convinced her to return.

Following the conclusion of the season's seventh episode, Rao departed the series after one season.

Taglines
Janet: "I don't like trouble unless I've caused it."
Jackie: "Watch out world because I'm shining brighter than ever."
Cherry: "Life is a journey, not a competition."
Kyla: "Diamonds aren't a girl's best friend, champagne is."
Gamble: "I'm no fool, but I don't mind acting like one."
Anjali: "Fake news I can handle, fake people? Not in this life."
Simone: "Keep your standards high and your stilettos higher."

Episodes
{| class="wikitable plainrowheaders"
|+The Real Housewives of Melbourne, season 5 episodes
|-
! scope="col" style="background-color: #94287d; color: #ffffff" | No. inseries
! scope="col" style="background-color: #94287d; color: #ffffff" | No. inseason
! scope="col" style="background-color: #94287d; color: #ffffff" | Title
! scope="col" style="background-color: #94287d; color: #ffffff" | Original air date
! scope="col" style="background-color: #94287d; color: #ffffff" | Overnight Australian viewers
|-

|}

Broadcast
Season five of The Real Housewives of Melbourne premiered on 10 October 2021, with episodes airing weekly, Sundays at 8:30pm AEST on FOX Arena. Episodes will also be available on demand via Foxtel Now and Binge. This is the first season of the Foxtel Original series to broadcast on FOX Arena, since the channels rebrand from Arena on 1 July 2020.

In November 2021, Foxtel Executive Director of Television Brian Walsh commented “The number one most-viewed show on Binge for the last three weeks has been The Real Housewives of Melbourne. Beating The Walking Dead, beating Succession.”

Reception

Awards
In October 2021, The Real Housewives of Melbourne season five was nominated for Best Reality Series in the eleventh Australian Academy of Cinema and Television Arts Awards.

References

External links

 
 

The Real Housewives of Melbourne
2021 Australian television seasons